Anjana Mumtaz (born 4 January 1941) is an Indian actress, who is known for her supporting roles in over a hundred Hindi, Marathi and Gujarati-language films. Born as Anjana Manjrekar, she married Sajid Mumtaz, an Air India official.

Filmography
2011 The Life Zindagi as Doctor
2008 Tulsi as Mom
2006 Sarhad Paar
2006 Janani as Tarun's mom
2006 Unns: Love... Forever as Ria's mom
2005 Kasak as Mrs. Sharma (Amar's mom)
2003 Jodi Kya Banayi Wah Wah Ramji
2003 Koi... Mil Gaya as Mrs. Harbans Saxena
2003 Stumped as Anjana
2002 Akhiyon Se Goli Maare as Sulekha Bhangare
2002 Yeh Mohabbat Hai as Chand's mother
2002 Tum Jiyo Hazaron Saal as Dr. Anju
2001 Kasam as Mrs. Jaswant Singh
2001 Ittefaq as Vikram's Mother
2001 Inteqam as Mrs. Kapoor
2000 Krodh as Mrs. Verma
2000 Dhadkan as Anjali's mother
1999 Chehraa
1999 Dahek as Mrs. Roshan
1999 Hote Hote Pyar Ho Gaya as Arjun's mom
1999 Jai Hind as Urmila
1999 Jaalsaaz
1998 Barsaat Ki Raat
1998 Hatya Kaand
1998 Zulm O Situm as Mrs. Sharma
1998 Dulhe Raja as Mrs. Elizabeth Singhania
1998 Aakrosh as Anjali Malhotra
1998 Miss 420 as Anjana
1998 Yeh Na Thi Hamari Qismat
1997 Dil Ke Jharoke Main as Mrs. Mahendrapratap Rai
1997 Mohabbat Ki Aag
1997 Jodidar as Munna's mom / Savita
1997 Share Bazaar
1997 Tumse Pyar Ho Gaya
1996 Bhairavi asRadha (Ragini's mom)
1996 Hahakaar (as Anjana)
1996 Zordaar as Shiva & Tony's mom
1996 Dushman Duniya Ka as Asha (Lata's mom)
1996 Khiladiyon Ka Khiladi as Mrs. Malhotra (Akshay's mom)
1996 Tu Chor Main Sipahi as Kaushalya Varma
1996 Saajan Chale Sasural as Shyamsunder's mom
1995 Haqeeqat as Sumitra - Shivcharan's wife
1995 Kalyug Ke Avtaar as Anjana
1995 Sabse Bada Khiladi as Gomti Chachi
1995 Jeena Nahin Bin Tere
1994 Beta Ho To Aisa as Laxmi - Anand's wife
1994 Cheetah as Mrs. Rajeshwar
1994 Paramaatma as Rajni's mom
1994 Eena Meena Deeka as Raju's Mother
1993 Sangram
1993 Krishan Avtaar
1993 Aadmi (1993 film)
1993  Shaktiman As (Parvati) Mukesh Khanna's Wife
1993 Dil Hai Betaab
1993 Police Wala as Mrs Rakesh
1993 Dil Tera Aashiq
1992  Dil Hi To Hai (1992 film)
1992 Khuda Gawah as Salma Mirza
1992 Tirangaa
1992 Yaad Rakhegi Duniya
1992 Naach Govinda Naach
1992 Deedar
1992 Anaam
1991 Prem Qaidi
1991 Shikari: The Hunter
1991 Banjaran
1991 Dancer
1991 Phool Aur Kaante
1991 Do Matwale
1991 Saajan
1991 Chamatkar
1990 Aag Ka Gola
1989 Kala Bazaar
1989 Nigahen: Nagina Part II
1989 Farz Ki Jung
1989 Vardi
1989 Bhrashtachar
1989 Dost Garibon Ka
1989 Mitti Aur Sona
1989 Tridev
1988  Khatron Ke Khiladi  as sumanti
1986 Ghar Sansar
1986 Samundar
1986 Vikram Betaal as Princess Meenakshi
1983 Ganga Meri Maa
1981 Mahabali Hanuman
1979 Do Hawaldaar
1977 Rangaa Aur Raja 
1976 Tumcha Aamcha Jamle [ Marathi film]
1975  Salaakhen
1973 Do Phool
1973 Bandhe Haath
1969 Mahua
1969 Sambandh
1970 Maa Ka Anchal

Television

References

External links

 
 

1941 births
Living people
Indian film actresses
21st-century Indian actresses
Indian television actresses
Actresses in Hindi cinema
Actresses in Marathi cinema
Actresses from Mumbai
Place of birth missing (living people)
20th-century Indian actresses
Actors from Mumbai